Naaz Mohammed (born 8 June 1998), known professionally as Naaz, is a Dutch-Kurdish singer. Born and raised in the Netherlands, she initially gained media attention after she auditioned for Holland's Got Talent in 2014.

Personal life 
Naaz Mohammed was born in Gorinchem, but moved to Rotterdam when she was two. Her parents fled Iraq during the Gulf War; Naaz's father is a doctor, and her mother is his assistant. She was bullied in school but found comfort in the words of one of her teachers. A car accident in which her parents were wounded was a turning point in her life and that of her parents; before, music was a "no-go" for them and she had to abide by a strict dress code, but after the accident the family was more open with and accepting of each other.

Naaz is married to a man named Kevin.

Career

2014-2018: Career beginnings, Bits of Naaz 
In 2014, Naaz took part in Holland's Got Talent.

On 13 November 2015, Naaz featured in Yellow Claw and Flux Pavilion's song, "Catch Me". On 30 September 2016, she released her first solo song, "Sadboy". Naaz created the songs on Bits of Naaz in her room, using a computer, a microphone, and a keyboard. She recorded most of the songs in the EP in December 2017. At the time, she wasn't allowed to go to the studio because her parents did not want her to take a career in music. Naaz later found a manager who persuaded her parents to let her continue a career as a musician. On 18 May 2017, Naaz released her debut single, "Words". A music video was released to accompany the song on June 8. On 18 August 2017, Naaz released her second single, "Can't". A music video for the song came out a week later. On 13 October 2017, she released her third single, "Up to Something". On 25 October 2017, Naaz performed "Words" on Vevo DSCVR. On 12 February 2018, Naaz released her fourth single, "Loving Love". The single entered the Dutch Singles Tip and peaked at #30.

On 30 April 2018, Naaz released her debut EP, Bits of Naaz. Bits of Naaz debuted and peaked at #81 in the Netherlands, and its success led to her to play at Rock Werchter and various European countries; she received two Edison Awards for the EP. Naaz joined Hayley Kiyoko on her European Encore Tour.

2019-present: The Beautiful Struggle, current music 
On 14 June 2019, Naaz released the first single, "TAPED", for her second EP, the beautiful struggle, and the second single, "damage", in September 2019, which she said was a song about "emotionally damaged DNA". On 27 September 2019, Naaz released the song "it's not you it's me". On 4 October 2019, Naaz released her sophomore EP, the beautiful struggle.

Naaz joined Melanie Martinez on her K-12 tour in 2020. She went on her own headline tour promote her EP.

On 10 July 2020, Naaz released the single "Mute Love".

On 31 May 2022, Naaz released the single "Sad Violins", her first in two years.

Awards and nominations 
Naaz has won two Edison Awards, a Dutch music award, and was nominated in two categories of the XITE Awards in 2017.

In January 2020, Naaz won two awards at the Music Moves Europe Talent Awards, a music awards ceremony funded by the European Union. Award winners received prizes of €10,000, with an additional €5,000 for the Public Choice award, which Naaz won.

Discography

Extended plays

Singles

As lead artist

Other charted songs

Artistry 
Naaz has listed Linkin Park, Lorde, and Tove Lo as musical inspirations.

References

External links

Dutch women singers
Dutch people of Iraqi descent
Kurdish women singers
Kurdish singer-songwriters
1998 births
Living people
Dutch people of Kurdish descent